Germ theory denialism is the pseudoscientific belief that germs do not cause infectious disease, and that the germ theory of disease is wrong. It usually involves arguing that Louis Pasteur's model of infectious disease was wrong, and that Antoine Béchamp's was right. In fact, its origins are rooted in Béchamp's empirically disproven (in the context of disease) theory of pleomorphism. Another obsolete variation is known as terrain theory and postulates that the state of the internal environment determines if germs cause disease rather than germs being the sole cause of it.

History 

Germ theory denialism (GTD) is as old as germ theory itself, beginning with the rivalry of Pasteur and Béchamp. Pasteur's work in preventing beverage contamination led him to discover that it was due to microorganisms and led him to become the first scientist to prove the validity of the theory and to popularize it in Europe. Before him, scientists such as Girolamo Fracastoro (who had the idea that fomites could harbor the seeds of contagion), Agostino Bassi (who discovered that the muscardine disease of silkworms was caused by a fungus that was named Beauveria bassiana), Friedrich Henle (who developed the concepts of contagium vivum and contagium animatum), and others had proposed ideas similar to germ theory.

Béchamp strongly contested Pasteur's view, proposing a competing idea known as the pleomorphic theory of disease. This theory says that all life is based on forms that a certain class of organisms take during stages of their life cycles and that germs are attracted to the environment of diseased tissue rather than being the cause of it. Proponents of this idea insist that microbes that live in an organism go through the same stages of their development. According to Günther Enderlein, the stages are as follows:

 colloid – microbe (primitive phase)
 bacteria (middle phase)
 fungus (end phase)

Terrain theory 

The terrain theory is a variation of Béchamp's ideas that is also an obsolete medical theory that held that diseases were caused by the composition of the body. The "terrain", will attract germs to come as scavengers of the weakened or poorly defended tissue. Béchamp believed that the pH of the body is important, and that an acidic pH will attract germs and an alkaline pH will repel them. Pasteur disproved spontaneous generation with a series of experiments in the 1870s. However, understanding the cause of a sickness does not always immediately lead to effective treatment of sickness, and the great decline in mortality during the 19th century stemmed mostly from improvements in hygiene and cleanliness. In fact, one of the first movements to deny the germ theory, the Sanitary Movement, was nevertheless central in developing America's public health infrastructure. Providing clean water and sanitation reduced the environment for pathogens to develop, and mortality rates fell dramatically.

Status 

Germ theory denialism is counter to over a century of experiments and practical observations, and the prevailing opinion of most doctors and scientists.

GTD has significant overlap with chiropractic practice. Many chiropractors believe immunity to be a function of spine alignment and of the brain's ability to communicate efficiently with the body and that it has little to nothing to do with external pathogens.

A common thread among many alternative medicine proponents is opposition to vaccines, and some use GTD to justify their claims. Germ theory deniers make many claims about the biological underpinnings of the theory and the historical record that are at odds with what most modern scientists and historians accept. Another claim from the anti-vaccine community involves the theory that all diseases are caused by toxins due to inadequate diet and health practices.

See also
 Vaccine hesitancy
 HIV/AIDS denialism
 COVID-19 misinformation
 List of germ theory denialists
 Hygiene hypothesis

 Pleomorphism (microbiology)

References

Biology theories
Denialism
Microbiology
Obsolete medical theories
Pseudoscience
Alternative medicine